Edward Paul Youds (born 3 May 1970) is an English former professional footballer, who played as a defender from 1988 to 2005.

He notably played in the Premier League with Ipswich Town and Charlton Athletic, having also played in the Football League for Everton, Cardiff City, Wrexham, Bradford City and Huddersfield Town before finishing his career in non-League with Grays Athletic.

Playing career
Born in Liverpool, Youds began his career with Everton and also played for Cardiff City, Wrexham, Ipswich Town, Bradford City, Charlton Athletic, Huddersfield Town and Grays Athletic, before retiring in 2005 at 35.

He was captain for Bradford City's 1996 Second Division play-off final victory against Notts County. While at Charlton, he played in the club's dramatic win over Sunderland in the 1998 First Division play-off final, winning 7–6 on penalties after a 4–4 draw.

Personal life
Youds now works as a property development manager in London.

References

External links

1970 births
Living people
Footballers from Liverpool
English footballers
Association football defenders
Premier League players
English Football League players
Isthmian League players
Everton F.C. players
Cardiff City F.C. players
Wrexham A.F.C. players
Ipswich Town F.C. players
Bradford City A.F.C. players
Charlton Athletic F.C. players
Huddersfield Town A.F.C. players
Grays Athletic F.C. players